Kenneth Phillip Kocher (born July 30, 1980) is a former American football defensive lineman who last played for the Columbus Destroyers in the Arena Football League. Kocher was a Parade High School All-American and a standout at UCLA.

External links
Destroyers' player profile
UCLA Bruins bio
Stats from arenafan.com

1980 births
Living people
Sportspeople from Fullerton, California
American football defensive linemen
UCLA Bruins football players
Los Angeles Avengers players
Columbus Destroyers players